Pahutoxin, formerly called ostracitoxin, is a neurotoxin present in  the mucous secretions of boxfish (Ostraciidae) skin, while under stress. It is an ichthyotoxic, hemolytic, nonpeptide (which is relatively unusual, although similar to tetrodotoxin in this way) toxin. It is heat-stable and non-dialyzable, that is, foamed in aqueous solutions, and is toxic to various biological systems. It is unique among known fish poisons. It is toxic to other boxfish as well and looks like red tide and sea cucumber toxins in general properties. Although it is not recommended, it is a growing trend to keep boxfish in a home aquarium. Members of the family Ostraciidae secrete an ichthyotoxic mucus from their skin when stressed or disturbed.

The boxfish must be alive to synthesize its bodily chemicals into the toxin, therefore it cannot release its toxin after it dies. It may, however, have residual toxin if it were in the process of releasing toxin when it died.

References

Ichthyotoxins
Quaternary ammonium compounds
Acetate esters
Neurotoxins
Cationic surfactants
Choline esters